The Branscomb Glacier is an Antarctic glacier,  long, flowing west from the north-west side of Vinson Massif (the highest point in Antarctica) into Nimitz Glacier, in the Sentinel Range of the Ellsworth Mountains. Its upper course receives ice influx from both Goodge Col and Jacobsen Valley, while the tributary Roché Glacier joins Branscomb Glacier just northwest of Príncipe de Asturias Peak.

The glacier was mapped by the USGS from surveys and USN aerial photographs between 1957 and 1960.  It was named by US-ACAN after Lewis M. Branscomb, Chairman of the National Science Board from 1982 to 1984.

See also
 List of glaciers in the Antarctic
 Glaciology

Maps
 Vinson Massif.  Scale 1:250 000 topographic map.  Reston, Virginia: US Geological Survey, 1988.
 Antarctic Digital Database (ADD). Scale 1:250000 topographic map of Antarctica. Scientific Committee on Antarctic Research (SCAR). Since 1993, regularly updated.

References
 SCAR Composite Gazetteer of Antarctica.

Glaciers of Ellsworth Land
Ellsworth Mountains